Local elections will be held in the city of Dasmariñas on May 13, 2013 together with the National and the provincial level elections. Since Dasmariñas is a first class city in terms of income and the 2nd largest city in southern Luzon in terms of population, however it still an ordinary component city, it means it still elect a provincial official, despite its own representation in the congress.

Background
Since 1998, Barzagas have dominated in the elections. Their allies have also won several positions in the city/municipal council. In 2010, the Barzagas were members of Lakas-Kampi-CMD supporting Gilbert Teodoro, who lost to Benigno Aquino III of the Liberal Party. When the 15th Congress of the Philippines started, Pidi became a member of the majority group of Feliciano Belmonte. The following year his faction from Lakas-Kampi established the new party, National Unity Party.

This 2013, Pidi Barzaga and his wife Jenny is running for their last term for congressman and mayor, respectively, together with Vice Mayor Valeriano "Vale" Encabo. Although they are running under the National Unity Party, they are also nominated by the Liberal Party due to electoral alliance with Rep. Ayong Maliksi, the alliance called as Team Dasma.

Meanwhile, last term Councilor Gavino "Gabby" Mercado, former Barzaga's allied, are still with the Lakas party, and in alliance with Gov. Jonvic Remulla and Jolo Revilla, is running for mayor along with Miguelito "Mike" Ilano who was lost for board member of 4th district in 2010, is running for congressman. The Mercado group known as the Amazing 16 which included Remulla and Revilla in the coalition.

Congress
Elpidio "Pidi" Barzaga is the incumbent. Although he is running under the National Unity Party, he is also nominated by the Liberal Party.

Provincial Board
Although Dasmariñas is a large city not only in Calabarzon region but also in the entire Southern Luzon in terms of income and population, however, it is still not an independent city, and is still in the jurisdiction of the Province of Cavite (4th district) thus it can allow its people to run in and elect to the provincial positions. Incumbent Board Members Teofilo Rudy Lara and Raul Rex Mangubat, both from NUP and Liberal Party are the two candidates to the post of provincial board members. No other opponents are running.

Mayoral

Mayor
Jenny Barzaga is the incumbent, running against incumbent City Councilor Gavino "Gabby" Mercado, who is in his last term.

National Unity Party (Philippines)

Vice Mayor
Valeriano "Vale" Encabo is the incumbent. He will oppose Liga ng mga Barangay President and Brgy. Fatima III Chairman Antonio "Damo" Ferrer (namesake of Cavite Rep. Antonio Ferrer, who is running for Mayor of neighboring General Trias).

National Unity Party (Philippines)

City Council
Election in the city council is at large at 12 seats on the line. Some candidates from Lakas–CMD are considered as independent because they did not submit their certificate of nomination from their party. 28 people are running, 8 of them are incumbent, all from Team Dasma (NUP/LP) coalition. All 12 candidates of Team Dasma are won.

Term limited candidates are the following:
Gavino Mercado – running for Mayor under Lakas–CMD and United Nationalist Alliance
Francisco Barreto – served as campaign manager for Team Dasma
Cecilio Dedase, Jr.
Hermigildo Mendoza

Candidates

Administration coalition (Team Dasma/Team Jenny)

Opposition coalition (Amazing 16/Team Gabby)

Independent candidates not in tickets

Notes
 A* Cantimbuhan is belatedly nominated by the Liberal Party; he is indicated as a National Unity Party on the ballot.
 B* del Rosario is also belatedly nominated by the Nacionalista Party; he is also indicated as a Lakas–CMD on the ballot.

Results

|-
|bgcolor=black colspan=5|

External links
Official website of the Commission on Elections
 Official website of National Movement for Free Elections (NAMFREL)
Official website of the Parish Pastoral Council for Responsible Voting (PPCRV)

Elections in Cavite
2013 Philippine local elections
Politics of Dasmariñas
2013 elections in Calabarzon